Roy Lyle Davidson (February 15, 1906 – April 25, 1999) was a farmer and a provincial politician from Alberta, Canada. He served as a member of the Legislative Assembly of Alberta from 1964 to 1967 sitting with the governing Social Credit caucus.

Political career
Davidson ran for a seat to the Alberta Legislature as a Social Credit candidate in a by-election held on January 20, 1964. Davidson won his party nomination in a convention held in Acme on December 24, 1963. He had been involved with the party as a volunteer for 20 years prior to seeking the nomination.

In the election Davidson won a hotly contested four-way race over Liberal leader David Hunter and two other candidates to hold the seat for his party.

Davidson did not run for a second term in office retiring at dissolution of the assembly in 1967.

References

External links
Legislative Assembly of Alberta Members Listing
Mention of Roy Davidson's death

1906 births
1999 deaths
Alberta Social Credit Party MLAs